Lundi Tyamara (16 December 1978  27 January 2017) also known as Lundi, was a South African gospel singer.

Career 
Lundi started as a backing vocalist for Rebecca Malope, he was then offered his first solo record deal by Tshepo Nzimande. In 1998, Lundi Tyamara released his debut album titled Mphefumlo Wami which sold almost 400,000 copies, he went on to release more than 20 albums in his career winning several awards. Lundi was one of the best selling gospel artists of all time in South Africa, selling over 3 million album copies.

Death 
He died of stomach TB and a liver condition at Edenvale hospital in Johannesburg and was buried in Worcester.

Discography

Albums 
Mphefumlo Wami 1998
Mvuleleni Angene 1999
Ubuhlungu 2000
Phaphamani 2001
Lundi 2002
Lundi 2003
Ngiyabonga 2004
Umthandazo 2006
Impilo 2007
Inkos' Iyayazi 2008 & 2009
Uhambo Lwami 2010
Lundi 2010
Backyard Scars 2012

Singles 
Mphefumulo Wami
Nginga hlanzwa
Mama wami
Mina Ngithemb'uJesu
Akuvumi
Bekungelula
Moyo'ingcwele
Tumelo ke theb
Uma ngiguqa
Thembela kuye
Uthando lukababa
Mvuleleni angene
Phaphamani
Ngaphakathi
Mawuhlakaniphe
Bawo Wethu
Hlala nami
Bawo
Bohlala Bejabula
Wakrazulwa
Nxolele
Nginike amehlo
Ongcongcozayo
Umama
Ndim Lo Nkosi
Ungumalusi
Nkosi sihlangene
Bulelani ku Jehova
Benzenjalo
Leth'ukukhanya
Siyakubonga

Awards 
Best Gospel artist at the Kora Awards 2003
Best African Traditional Gospel – South African Music Awards 2008
Classic Of All Times Size Sifike Ezweni – Crown Gospel Music Awards 2010
Best Music Video – Crown Gospel Music Awards 2014

References 

2017 deaths
South African gospel singers
1978 births